Anomalocardia flexuosa is a species of bivalves belonging to the family Veneridae.

The species is found in the Americas and Malesia.

References

Veneridae
Bivalves of North America
Bivalves described in 1767
Taxa named by Carl Linnaeus